Corey Lewis (born October 17, 1991) is an American racing driver who currently competes for Paul Miller Racing in the IMSA SportsCar Championship.

Career

Early career
Lewis began his racing career at the age of 7, competing in regional karting series under the tutelage of Michael Andretti. In 2002, he collected the Stars of Karting Regional Championship, and two years later was scored runner-up in the World Karting Association National Series. In 2007, Lewis began competing at the Skip Barber Racing School, winning 14 of the 26 races he entered over the course of three years at the school. Prior to the 2012 Star Mazda Championship season, Lewis completed a test with Team GDT at Barber Motorsports Park with plans to drive for the team that season. However, Lewis would compete in just one event for the team in 2012, finishing 12th and 21st at the Toronto double-header in July.

Sports car racing
In 2013, Lewis began competing in the Continental Tire Sports Car Challenge, marking his first foray into sports car and touring car racing. The following season, he scored his first win in the series, competing in the Street Tuner class for BERG Racing at Indianapolis. 2015 marked a double title success for Lewis, as he took the Pro-Am class title in both the Lamborghini Super Trofeo North America as well as the Lamborghini Super Trofeo World Final.

For 2016, Lewis extended his partnership with Change Racing, signing for the 2016 IMSA SportsCar Championship season alongside co-driver Spencer Pumpelly. The same season, Lewis joined the Lamborghini GT3 Junior Program, representing the team in IMSA competition alongside Richard Antinucci, Edoardo Piscopo, and Cedric Sbirrazzuoli. Change Racing registered a best finish of 5th, at VIR and Mosport, as the duo finished 9th in GTD-class points. That winter, Lewis traveled to Asia to compete with VS Racing in the GT class of the Asian Le Mans Series. A return to Change Racing in 2017 was highlighted by Lewis' first IMSA SportsCar Championship victory, as the team took GTD class honors at VIR in August.

For 2018, alongside a return to the Lamborghini Super Trofeo North America, Lewis signed with P1 Motorsports to compete in the IMSA Prototype Challenge, sharing the #17 entry with Matt Dicken. Supplementing Lewis' 2018 schedule was a pair of endurance races with Paul Miller Racing, as he competed with the team at the Sebring and Petit Le Mans. In his opening race with the team, Paul Miller Racing claimed class honors, marking Lewis' first class victory at the 12 Hours of Sebring. Lewis' final triumph of 2018 came in November, where he and co-driver Madison Snow were crowned Pro-class champions of the Lamborghini Super Trofeo North America. He would defend his title the following season, before taking the Pro-Am class title in 2020. 

In 2020, Lewis took his first class victory at the 24 Hours of Daytona, competing once again with Paul Miller Racing. Later that season, he made his return to the Michelin Pilot Challenge, the same series in which he'd begun his sports car racing career seven years prior, signing with Canadian team Motorsport in Action. The team would score one victory that season, finishing 9th in points. His additional Lamborghini Super Trofeo commitments meant that he'd occasionally drive for three different teams, in three different cars and series in one race weekend.

In 2021, Lewis joined K-Pax Racing's two-car effort in the returning Pro class of the GT World Challenge America, partnering with Lamborghini factory driver Giovanni Venturini. Lewis and Venturini would score their first win for the team in May at Circuit of the Americas. After continuing to compete predominantly in Lamborghini machinery during 2021 and 2022, Lewis returned to Paul Miller Racing ahead of the 2023 IMSA SportsCar Championship season.

Racing record

Career summary

* Season still in progress.

Complete WeatherTech SportsCar Championship results
(key) (Races in bold indicate pole position)

References

External links
Corey Lewis at IMSA

1991 births
Living people
WeatherTech SportsCar Championship drivers
Blancpain Endurance Series drivers
Asian Le Mans Series drivers
24 Hours of Daytona drivers
GT World Challenge America drivers
Ombra Racing drivers
Euronova Racing drivers
Michelin Pilot Challenge drivers
Lamborghini Squadra Corse drivers
Lamborghini Super Trofeo drivers